The Roanoke Rapids Jays were a Coastal Plain League baseball team based in Roanoke Rapids, North Carolina, USA that existed from 1947 to 1952. They were affiliated with the Washington Senators from 1951 to 1952.

Notable players include Ted Abernathy and Stu Martin.

References

Baseball teams established in 1947
1947 establishments in North Carolina
Defunct minor league baseball teams
Washington Senators minor league affiliates
Professional baseball teams in North Carolina
Defunct baseball teams in North Carolina
Baseball teams disestablished in 1952
Coastal Plain League (minor league) teams